Edwin Eugene Bagley (May 29, 1857January 29, 1922) was an American composer, most famous for composing the march National Emblem.

Bagley was born in Craftsbury, Vermont on May 29, 1857.  He began his music career at the age of nine as a vocalist and comedian with Leavitt's Bellringers, a company of entertainers that toured many of the larger cities of the United States. He began playing the cornet, traveling for six years with the Swiss Bellringers. After his touring days, he joined Blaisdell's Orchestra of Concord, New Hampshire.

In 1880, he came to Boston as a solo cornet player at The Park Theater. For nine years, he traveled with the Bostonians, an opera company. While with this company, he changed from cornet to trombone. He also performed with the Germania Band of Boston and the Boston Symphony Orchestra. In the early 1900s he played with Wheeler's Band in Bellows Falls, Vermont. Wheeler's Band was the first band to publicly perform Bagley's "National Emblem March" in 1906.

Edwin Eugene Bagley is best known for composing marches and in particular for the famous march National Emblem.  This piece is played as a patriotic tune on Independence Day celebrations in the United States and features an excerpt of "The Star-Spangled Banner". It is also used by the U.S. military when presenting and retiring the colors. A theme from this march is popularly sung with the words "and the monkey wrapped his tail around the flagpole".

Bagley died in Keene, New Hampshire on January 29, 1922.

Bagley's Marches
L'Agresseur (The Aggressor) March  (1915)
America Victorious
American Salute
Arbitrator March (1908)
Bagley's Imperial March (1901)
Col. Estey March (1908)
Counselor March (1917)
Father of His Country March (1931)
Federation March
Front Section March (1909)
Holy Cross Commandery March (1902)
Knight Templar March (1911)
March Imperial
The Morning Light March (1900)
National Emblem (1906)
Our Republic March (1908)
Patriot March (1902)
Post 68 G.A.R. (1902)
Regent March
Royal March (1902)

Edwin was married to Jannette S. Hoyt (1855–1927).  His brother Ezra M. Bagley (January 3, 1853 – July 8, 1886) was first trumpet in the Boston Symphony Orchestra 1880-1884 and also composed marches for bands.
Edwin died at the Elliot Community Hospital in Keene, New Hampshire and is buried at the Greenlawn Cemetery in Keene.  The Victorian Bandstand in Keene is named in his honor.

See also
March music composers

References

Bridges, Glenn.  Pioneers in Brass.  Detroit: Sherwood Publications, 1965.  (Information on his brother Ezra)
Rehrig, William H. The Heritage Encyclopedia of Band Music.  Westerville, Ohio: Integrity Press, vol. 1 (1991) and vol. 3 supplement (1996)
Bellows Falls Vermont Historical Society Records.

External links
AllMusic 

Find a Grave 
Internet Movie Database 

1857 births
1922 deaths
19th-century American composers
19th-century American male musicians
20th-century American composers
20th-century American male musicians
American male composers
March musicians
Musicians from Vermont
People from Craftsbury, Vermont